Charles Montecatini (1615–1699) was a Roman Catholic prelate who served as Titular Archbishop of Chalcedon (1690–1699).

Biography
Charles Montecatini was born in Ferrara, Italy in 1615 and ordained a priest in 26 March 1656.
On 10 July 1690, he was appointed during the papacy of Pope Alexander VIII as Titular Archbishop of Chalcedon. On 16 July 1690, he was consecrated bishop by Flavio Chigi, Cardinal-Bishop of Porto e Santa Rufina, with Prospero Bottini, Titular Archbishop of Myra, and Giuseppe Bologna, Archbishop Emeritus of Benevento, serving as co-consecrators. He served as Titular Archbishop of Chalcedon until his death on 20 March 1699.

References

17th-century Roman Catholic titular bishops
Bishops appointed by Pope Alexander VIII
1615 births
1699 deaths